Jenny Simpson (born in 1973 in Nashville, Tennessee) is an American country music singer. She was signed to Mercury Nashville and released her self-titled debut album in 1998.

Simpson's only single, "Ticket Out of Kansas", peaked at number 54 on the Billboard Hot Country Singles & Tracks chart. It received a favorable review from Deborah Evans Price of Billboard, who said that "Simpson's nuanced vocal performance makes listeners feel as if they are boarding the bus with her."

Discography

Albums

Singles

Music videos

References

1973 births
American women country singers
American country singer-songwriters
Living people
Country musicians from Tennessee
People from Nashville, Tennessee
Singer-songwriters from Tennessee
21st-century American singers
21st-century American women singers